Horacio Olivo (1933 – July 24, 2016) was a Puerto Rican actor, comedian, and television/radio personality, as well as a classically trained singer.

Born in Dorado, Puerto Rico, he got his start in show business in 1949 at long defunct WNEL as a radio soap opera actor.
He graduated from the Instituto Comercial de Puerto Rico, and studied for 3 years at the Puerto Rico Music Conservatory.
He participated in various Festival Casals concerts as a tenor in the chorus section.

Olivo has also acted in various plays during the Puerto Rican and International Theatre Festivals, was the station announcer for all the WIPR stations (WIPR, WIPR-FM, and WIPR-TV), and acted in comedy TV shows like Como está la situación, and Esto no tiene nombre, produced by Tommy Muñiz.

Horacio Olivo is perhaps better known as the booming voice behind Los Rayos Gamma. One of the Rayos Gamma's better known parodies was Olivo's hugely popular antagonistic ode to the U.S. Navy, based on Agustín Lara's song "Granada". He was reportedly fired from his WIPR post because of his political beliefs (his was the official voice of the Puerto Rico Independence Party's radio spots), and for a while, he owned a fried chicken establishment in his hometown of Dorado.

Olivo had been partially retired from public life because of health-related issues: he had open heart surgery in October 2011. He nominally remained a part of Los Rayos Gamma, who filmed a comedy interview with him for their latest show in November 2011. However, Olivo suffered a cardiac incident on 22 November 2011. On July 24, 2016 Olivo died at San Juan's Pavía Hospital where he was interned since July 20 with various health complications. He was 83.

The Olivo family had eight siblings, of which Horacio is the oldest. The fifth sibling, Eddie Olivo, founded and headed Puerto Rico's plena collective, Los Pleneros del Quinto Olivo.

References

1933 births
2016 deaths
People from Dorado, Puerto Rico
Puerto Rican comedians
Puerto Rican male television actors